Rosebery is a town on the west coast of Tasmania, Australia. It is at the northern end of the West Coast Range, in the shadow of Mount Black and adjacent to the Pieman River now Lake Pieman.

It lies on the Murchison Highway, 25 kilometres north-east of Zeehan and is part of the Municipality of West Coast Council.

The population of Rosebery declined by 22% in the years between 1996-2001.
Its newer western area on the shore of Lake Pieman is known as Primrose.

History
Like most of the other settlements on the west coast of Tasmania, Rosebery is a mining town.  In 1893, prospector Tom McDonald discovered gold in alluvial wash, along with boulders of zinc-lead sulphide in dense rainforest on the slopes of Mount Black. McDonald pegged several claims in the name of the Rosebery Prospecting Association (named after Lord Rosebery), which later became the Rosebery Gold Mining Company.  The South Rosebery Mining Company was formed soon after to mine the southern continuation of the orebody.

In 1896, the Rosebery Gold Mining Company was reconstructed as the Tasmanian Copper Company, and the South Rosebery Mining Company became the Primrose Mining Company. Rosebery Post Office opened on 1 November 1897.

The main mineral found in the orebody was zinc, but due to the lack of a technique to successfully extract the zinc from the ore, little could be done to exploit the orebody.  One company formed to experiment in the processing of zinc ores was the Tasmanian Metals Extraction Company (TME) who built a large plant next to the track to Williamsford, completed in 1912.  The experiment was unsuccessful and the plant closed in 1914.

The Rosebery mines passed into the hands of the Mount Lyell Mining and Railway company in 1916, and the mines were eventually merged with the Electrolytic Zinc Company of Australasia (EZ), who had discovered an effective method for the extraction of zinc.  In 1926, construction of a processing mill at Rosebery began, and in 1931, an aerial ropeway to transport ore from the Hercules Mine near Williamsford was completed.  Due to the Great Depression, the Rosebery Mill was not completed until 1936.  The Rosebery Mine has operated continuously since then, with 75 year celebrations held during February, 2011.  The mine is currently operated by Minerals and Metals Group (MMG), producing zinc, lead, copper, silver and gold. Previous mine owners included Pasminco and Zinifex.

Prior to the construction of the Murchison Highway in the 1960s, the town was connected with Burnie and North West Tasmania via the Emu Bay Railway.

Climate
Rosebery has a damp oceanic climate (Cfb) with mild moist summers and cool, very wet winters. Sunshine is low; The city only receives 16.5 clear days annually, and as much as 168.1 cloudy days per annum. February is the "driest" month and September is the wettest, as the westerly wind belt (i.e. roaring forties) prevails the region.

Notable residents
 Richard Flanagan - author, historian and film director

Gallery

See also

 West Coast Tasmania Mines
 West Coast Tasmania Railways

References

Further reading

External links

Crib & Cradle - Stay in Authentic Miners Accommodation in the heart of Rosebery.
Mineral Resources Tasmania - Zinifex Rosebery mine
 Tourist information dated 2004
 Minerals and Metals Group
 'MMG Rosebery provides feedback on workforce testing' April 2010
http://www.lead.org.au/
http://www.lead.org.au/lg%20las%20mr.html
 Toxic heavy metals in Tasmania at SourceWatch

Localities of West Coast Council
Towns in Tasmania
Mining towns in Tasmania
Articles containing video clips
Pieman River Power Development